This is a partial discography of Giacomo Puccini's opera La bohème which premiered on 1 February 1896 at the Teatro Regio in Turin, conducted by Arturo Toscanini.

Recordings

References
Notes

Sources
American Record Guide, September/October 2000, Vol. 63, No. 5, pp. 73–83
La bohème: Discography, opera.stanford.edu
Budden, Julian, Puccini: His Life and Works, Oxford University Press, 2002, p. 494. .

Opera discographies
Operas by Giacomo Puccini